Michelle Smith (Born 9 May 1983 in Keighley, West Yorkshire) is a competitive sport shooter from England.

At the 2010 Commonwealth Games she won the Silver medal in the Women's 50 metre Prone Pairs event with Sharon Lee.

References

1983 births
Living people
English female sport shooters
ISSF rifle shooters
Commonwealth Games silver medallists for England
Shooters at the 2010 Commonwealth Games
Sportspeople from Keighley
Commonwealth Games medallists in shooting
British female sport shooters
Medallists at the 2010 Commonwealth Games